During the 1948–49 English football season, Brentford competed in the Football League Second Division. It was Harry Curtis' final season as manager and he was replaced by Jackie Gibbons in February 1949. Brentford ended the season in 18th-place, just one point away from a second relegation in three seasons, though the Bees advanced to the sixth round of the FA Cup for the third time in the club's history.

Season summary 

Brentford manager Harry Curtis prepared conservatively for the 1948–49 Second Division season, with inside forward Viv Woodward and wing half Paddy Harris being his only veteran additions to the first team squad. The Essential Work Order made it almost impossible for the Bees to sign any player aged under 30, due to the club having spent £28,300 (almost double the club's net income, equivalent to £ in ) on six new players during the previous financial year, with only Jack Chisholm and Fred Monk aged under 30. Curtis elected to build for the future with the signings of young players Les Devonshire, Jimmy Anders, Micky Bull and Billy Dare, but Dare was the only one of the quartet who would go on to make an impact on the first team. On the eve of the season, it was announced that Curtis would step down from the manager's position at the end of the campaign.

After two wins from the opening seven matches, Curtis signed Leicester City forward Peter McKennan for £8,000. He failed to have an immediate effect on the team's goalscoring problems, but Brentford were able to stay afloat in mid-table due to the low number of goals conceded. Amidst a dire run of form in league matches around the turn of the year, McKennan finally came into form and scored 9 goals in a seven-match spell, firing Brentford into the sixth round of the FA Cup for the second time in four seasons. The Bury fixture also marked the first match in charge for player-manager Jackie Gibbons, having replaced Harry Curtis, who remained at Griffin Park until the end of the season as an adviser to Gibbons.

Brentford's form deserted them in the wake of the FA Cup exit, with just two victories during the remaining 14 league matches of the season. Centre half Ron Greenwood was bought from Bradford Park Avenue for £9,000 in February 1949, with all of the money being recouped following the sale of captain Jack Chisholm to Sheffield United for £16,000 a month later. Advanced preparations for the 1949–50 season continued in April, with the £7,000 purchase of Jackie Goodwin and Wally Quinton from Birmingham City. Brentford slumped to an 18th-place finish, just one point above 21st-place Nottingham Forest. Young forward Billy Dare was blooded in the final two months of the season and showed promise for the future with four goals in the final six matches.

League table

Results
Brentford's goal tally listed first.

Legend

Football League Second Division

FA Cup

 Sources: Statto, 11v11, 100 Years Of Brentford

Playing squad 
Players' ages are as of the opening day of the 1948–49 season.

 Sources: 100 Years of Brentford, Timeless Bees

Coaching staff

Harry Curtis (21 August 1948 – 14 February 1949)

Jackie Gibbons (15 February – 7 May 1949)

Statistics

Appearances and goals

Players listed in italics left the club mid-season.
Source: 100 Years Of Brentford

Goalscorers 

Players listed in italics left the club mid-season.
Source: 100 Years Of Brentford

Management

Summary

Transfers & loans 
Cricketers are not included in this list.

References 

Brentford F.C. seasons
Brentford